Coenagria is a genus of moths of the family Noctuidae.

Species
 Coenagria nana (Staudinger, 1892)

References
 Coenagria at Markku Savela's Lepidoptera and Some Other Life Forms
 Natural History Museum Lepidoptera genus database

Hadeninae